WEC 11: Evolution was a mixed martial arts event promoted by World Extreme Cagefighting on August 20, 2004 at the Tachi Palace Hotel & Casino in Lemoore, California. The main event saw Shonie Carter take on Jason Biswell.

Results

See also 
 World Extreme Cagefighting
 List of WEC champions
 List of WEC events
 2004 in WEC

External links
 WEC 11 Results at Sherdog.com

World Extreme Cagefighting events
2004 in mixed martial arts
Mixed martial arts in California
Sports in Lemoore, California
2004 in sports in California